Alexandra "Lexie" Millard (born May 20, 1993) is an American professional racing cyclist, who currently rides for American amateur team LA Sweat.

References

External links
 

1993 births
Living people
American female cyclists
Place of birth missing (living people)
21st-century American women